Typhoon Nanmadol, known in the Philippines as Typhoon Yoyong, was the last of four consecutive tropical cyclones to strike the Philippines in 2004. A quickly moving system, Nanmadol brought heavy rainfall and strong winds over the same regions impacted by the previous storms, exacerbating flood conditions in Luzon and surrounding regions. Together Nanmadol and these systems accounted for around 1,000 deaths in the Philippines. The typhoon later became the first December tropical cyclone to strike Taiwan since record keeping began, bringing along with it heavy rain, which also affected nearby regions of eastern China. As an extratropical storm, Nanmadol brought gusty winds and rain to Japan.

Nanmadol developed from an isolated area of convection south-southwest of Pohnpei that became classified as a tropical depression on November 28. Within highly conducive conditions for development, the system reached tropical storm intensity the following day, followed by typhoon intensity on November 30. Shortly after, the typhoon made landfall at a similar intensity on Casiguran, Aurora, quickly moving over Luzon before reaching the South China Sea, where it recurved northward into hostile atmospheric conditions. Over the next few days, Nanmadol weakened and later transitioned into an extratropical cyclone near Taiwan on December 4, whereafter it merged with another extratropical system.

With the typhoon approaching landfall in an area still recovering from previous storms, relief agencies already servicing the region were forced to allocate additional resources to prepare for Nanmadol. Evacuation efforts assisted in moving almost 100,000 people into shelters. Effects from Nanmadol were most severe in Cagayan Valley, where 14 people were killed. Power outages were widespread across several islands. Overall, damage from the typhoon in the Philippines totaled ₱2.23 billion (US$39.3 million). Agricultural damage in Taiwan alone reached NT$670 million (US$20.8 million). Similar effects were felt in Japan, where the remnants of Nanmadol produced record-breaking rainfall and wind. Damage was particularly significant in Aichi Prefecture, totaling JP¥69.8 million (US$680,000). Overall, Nanmadol resulted in 77 fatalities and US$60.8 million in damage across three countries.

Meteorological history

With convection consolidating about a potential center of circulation, the Japan Meteorological Agency (JMA) classified the broad system as a tropical depression the following day. Rapid development of storms and organization ensued following classification, spurred by favorable conditions. At this point the tropical cyclone was assigned the name Nanmadol.

Conducive atmospheric conditions around Nanmadol on November 29 led to the development of a central dense overcast, followed shortly thereafter by the formation of an eye. Nanmadol was upgraded to severe tropical storm intensity at 0000 UTC on November 30 and became a typhoon twelve hours later, tracking near Satawal, Woleai, and Yap State during this intensification phase. Following the upgrade to typhoon status, intensification briefly slowed but continued soon thereafter. The typhoon maintained this strength for roughly twelve hours before slightly weakening as it neared Luzon.

Due to the rapid motion of Nanmadol, the typhoon crossed Luzon in under six hours, emerging into the South China Sea before 1800 UTC on December 2. Though land interaction with the Philippines did not significantly affect the cyclone, a shortwave trough forced Nanmadol to sharply curve northward, bringing it into hostile atmospheric conditions within the Luzon Strait. At 0000 UTC on December 3, the JMA downgraded Nanmadol to severe tropical storm status. Increased wind shear and the advection of dry air further weakened the tropical cyclone, and by midday on December 3, the storm's center of circulation became decoupled from the rest of the convection. At 2340 UTC that day, Nanmadol made landfall near Fangliao, Pingtung in Taiwan, becoming the first December tropical cyclone to strike the island in 108 years of record-keeping. Roughly six hours later on December 4, the JMA determined that Nanmadol had transitioned into an extratropical cyclone. These remnants soon merged with another low-pressure area, creating a more powerful system that later tracked over Japan.

Preparations

Initial forecasts following the formation of Nanmadol over open waters anticipated the typhoon to track directly into Luzon. On December 1, government sessions in Manila were temporarily suspended. Some commercial flights traversing to and from Luzon were cancelled in addition to ferry service between the eastern Bicol Region and Manila, stranding hundreds of passengers. Flight cancellations were primarily targeted at propeller aircraft as they were more susceptible to typhoon conditions. This impacted ongoing relief efforts, as the Philippine Air Force's fleet of rescue planes were also grounded. The impending storm also delayed the reopening of financial markets in Manila until December 3.

President Gloria Macapagal Arroyo ordered for precautionary measures to be undertaken by agencies under the purview of the National Disaster Coordinating Council (NDCC). In response, the German Foreign Office allocated €50,000 (US$67,000) to assist in preparations for Nanmadol. The Spanish Red Cross were forced to maintain relief supplies in the provinces of Aurora and Quezon in addition to managing ongoing relief efforts for regions impacted by Tropical Depression Winnie. Individual Red Cross chapters were tasked with closely monitoring the movement of relief stockpiles during these preparatory measures.

The NDCC also called for the evacuation of persons in potentially affected areas. Large-scale evacuations took place in Real, Quezon ahead of the approaching typhoon. According to the NDCC, 97,238 persons were evacuated in the lead-up to Nanmadol's Luzon landfall, with nearly 40,000 evacuating from the Bicol Region. However, the Office of Civil Defense documented the evacuation of approximately 168,000 civilians. Government shelters initially made to house displaced residents due to previous storms were adjusted to accommodate additional refugees evacuating due to the typhoon. In Catanduanes, 1,500 persons evacuated to these shelters. Other evacuees sought refuge in well-constructed buildings, as was the case in Mercedes, Eastern Samar, where 2,000 civilians stayed inside a school.

In Taiwan, the Central Weather Bureau issued a land warning for the island in advance of the typhoon. Potential impacts, which would likely be enhanced by the East Asian Monsoon, prompted Taiwanese president Chen Shui-bian to postpone political marches and campaign rallies intended for the upcoming presidential elections. In anticipation for the typhoon, schools and businesses in southern and eastern Taiwan were closed, along with the delaying of rail and air traffic. Kaohsiung International Airport was closed during the morning of December 4.

Impact and aftermath

Philippines

Damage assessments of Nanmadol's impacts in the Philippines found difficulty in distinguishing the storm's impacts from those of Typhoon Muifa, Tropical Storm Merbok, and Tropical Depression Winnie due to their rapid succession of effects. The NDCC, however, noted 70 fatalities as a result of Nanmadol alone, coupled with 157 injuries. The majority of deaths were associated with electrocutions or drownings. Approximately 160,000 people were displaced as well. Overall, the typhoon destroyed 10,457 households and damaged another 57,435. Damage was estimated at ₱2.23 billion (US$39.3 million).

Even prior to the Philippine landfall of Nanmadol, ongoing relief operations were hampered by the storm's overreaching effects. Search and rescue helicopters failed to reach planned destinations, which was also due in part to the country's small helicopter fleet. A navy gunboat refitted as a relief ship headed for Real, Quezon was forced to turn back due to high waves onset by the approaching typhoon which swept potentially hazardous logs into sea.

The first Philippine provinces to be impacted by the typhoon were Albay and Catanduanes, which suffered power outages after strong winds tore down power lines. One person was killed in Virac, Catanduanes after being electrocuted by a felled power line. In order to prevent more widespread outages, electrical service in some locations was deliberately shut down. Landslides triggered by Nanmadol in Aurora killed 25 people. On the Bicol Peninsula, eight fatalities occurred due to drowning, electrocution, or hypothermia.

In the aftermath of the typhoon, the Philippine Red Cross made a full emergency appeal for funding to assist in recovery from Nanmadol and preceding storms. The Philippines government declared a state of calamity for fifteen provinces, cities, and municipalities. Medical personnel were deployed to mitigate potential outbreaks of disease and transport injured persons to hospitals. The NDCC distributed 14,065 sacks of rice worth roughly ₱11 million (US$200,000).

Elsewhere

Shortly before transitioning into an extratropical cyclone, Nanmadol made landfall in Fangliao, Taiwan as a tropical storm. This made Nanmadol the first recorded tropical cyclone to strike Taiwan in the month of December since records began in 1896. The highest documented 24-hour rainfall total was at a station in Hualien County, which recorded  in that timeframe. Power outages disrupted electrical supply to 26,588 households, and agricultural losses in Taiwan as a result of Nanmadol equated to NT$670 million (US$20.8 million). Two people were killed on the island. The typhoon's swath of rainfall also extended to East China, which was also climatologically abnormal.

The extratropical remnants of Nanmadol brought record breaking rainfall and winds to Japan. A station in Shishikui, Tokushima received  of rain, the highest amount documented in the country. A  wind gust was recorded in Tokyo; this gust broke the record for the strongest gust recorded in the city since record-keeping began. Offshore Kagoshima Prefecture, a ferry capsized in rough waters, killing five. The captain of the ferry was later charged with professional negligence. In Aomori Prefecture, widespread power outages resulted from the strong winds. Heavy rains in Aichi Prefecture flooded several roads and damaged fisheries and agricultural land. One person was injured there, and damage totaled JP¥69.8 million (US$680,000).

See also

Other typhoons of the same name
Typhoon Zeb (1998) – Caused severe damage in both the Philippines and Taiwan before tracking through Japan
Tropical Depression Winnie (2004) – made landfall over Philippines, nearly 1,600 dead peoples just before Nanmadol struck
Typhoon Cimaron (2006) – One of the most intense typhoons to make landfall on Luzon
Typhoon Chebi (2006) – Rapidly intensified just prior to its eventual Philippine landfall

Notes

References

External links

JMA General Information of Typhoon Nanmadol (0427) from Digital Typhoon
JMA Best Track Data of Typhoon Nanmadol (0427) 
JMA Best Track Data (Graphics) of Typhoon Nanmadol (0427)
JMA Best Track Data (Text)
JTWC Best Track Data of Typhoon 30W (Nanmadol)
30W.NANMADOL from the U.S. Naval Research Laboratory

2004 Pacific typhoon season
Typhoons in the Philippines
Typhoons
Nanmadol